Eleventh Avenue is Ammonia's second and final studio album. It was released in Australia in May 1998.

It was a very different album to their previous effort, Mint 400, moving away from grunge-inspired guitar rock to include harmonies, samples and psychedelic keyboards.

The album was recorded and produced by Dave Fridmann (Flaming Lips, Mercury Rev), a choice made by the band in part due to the lack of control the band had over the first album. Two songs ("You're Not the Only One..." and "Monochrome") received extensive airplay on Triple J; however, the album failed to chart as well as its predecessor, only reaching #20 on the National Album charts.  Eleventh Avenue turned out to be the band's last album. It went out of print in March 2002.

Track listing
All lyrics written by Allan Balmont, Simon Hensworth and Dave Johnstone.

 "Eleventh Avenue" - 4:12
 "You're Not the Only One Who Feels This Way" - 3:54
 "Keep on My Side" - 3:26
 "Monochrome" - 2:07
 "Killswitch" - 4:26
 "Baby Blue" - 3:09
 "Wishing Chair" - 3:11
 "Keeping My Hands Tied" - 3:32
 "4711" - 4:02
 "Yeah Doin' It" - 3:14
 "Afterglow" - 3:35
 "Pipedream" / "Satin Only" (hidden track) - 14:26

Charts

Release history

Personnel
 Allan Balmont - drums
 Simon Hensworth - bass
 Dave Johnstone - guitar, vocals

References

1998 albums
Ammonia (band) albums
Murmur (record label) albums
Albums produced by Dave Fridmann